Edmund James Goodger (born 10 March 1929) is a former Australian rules footballer who played with Fitzroy in the Victorian Football League (VFL).

Goodger came to Fitzroy from Heidelberg, where he had won a best and fairest in 1948.

A defender, he spent much of his time at Fitzroy as a centre half-back, but also played in the ruck.

Goodger was second to Neville Broderick in Fitzroy's 1952 "best and fairest" award, missing out by a single vote.

He left Fitzroy at the end of the 1958 VFL season, to join Ivanhoe Amateurs as a playing coach.

References

1929 births
Australian rules footballers from Victoria (Australia)
Fitzroy Football Club players
Heidelberg Football Club players
Ivanhoe Amateurs Football Club players
Living people